Project Hope (希望工程) is a Chinese public service project organized by the China Youth Development Foundation (CYDF) and the Communist Youth League (CYL) Central Committee. Started on October 30, 1989, it aims to bring schools into poverty-stricken rural areas of China, to help children whose families are too poor to afford complete elementary school education. Through Project Hope, the CYDF has also sought to improve educational facilities and improve teaching quality in poorer regions.

Achievements 

By the end of 2004, Project Hope has
raised over 5.6 billion renminbi in funds.
financed education of more than 3,400,000 poor rural students
built 15940 "Hope Primary Schools" (希望小学), which consists of 2.5% of all the rural primary schools.
established "Project Hope Scholarship"(希望之星奖学金), providing financial assistance to about 130,000 secondary and tertiary students.
funded over 14,000 primary schools in rural areas to build libraries
built over 150 distance learning centers to help students living in remote areas.

Some 80 percent of the Hope Project primary schools and students aided by the project are located in China's middle and western regions, which are less developed. (Liu, 2004)

Influences 

According to a report by National Research Center for Science and Technology for Development (Xu, 1999), 93.9 percent of residents in 29 provincial capital cities aged above 16 have heard of Project Hope, and 63.5 percent have contributed to it in various ways. The report drew the conclusion that Project Hope has become the largest and most influential non-governmental welfare project in China.

Controversies

1994 allegations by Next Weekly
In January 1994, the Hong Kong weekly Next Magazine reported that Project Hope could not account for HK$70 million in donations, implying the donations from the people of Hong Kong to help the Chinese children have been misdirected to the pockets of certain people.  The affected party filed a libel lawsuit that ran for six years, resulting in Next Weekly paying HK$3.5 million in damages as well as court fees.

2002 embezzlement reports
In 2002, Project Hope was reportedly involved with embezzlement of donations. National Audit Office confirmed that in 2002 it audited financial situations of Project Hope but the report was never publicised. Then head of the project Xu Yongguang later went on as vice director of China Charity Federation.

Involvement with tobacco industry
In 2011 The Daily Telegraph reported that Project Hope accepts sponsorship from China Tobacco and allows schools to be named after cigarette brands, carry prominent pro-tobacco advertising, vend cigarette-shaped candy and sell individually-wrapped cigarettes outside school gates, in an attempt to create new smoking addicts to replace those dying of smoking-related diseases, without parents being aware of the dangers.

References 

 Liu, Fei. 2004. 15 years of Project Hope(希望工程15年). 
 Xu, Yongguang. 1999. How is Contribute Money Spent—Assessment Report of Hope Project Results(捐款是怎样花的希望工程效益评估报告). Zhejiang Renmin Publisher.

External links 
Official Homepage
People's Daily report 2004

Education in China
1989 establishments in China